Route 97E is a bus route in Budapest. This line currently runs between Örs Vezér tere and Erzsébet körút (Erzsébet Boulevard). Between Zrínyi utca (Zrínyi Street) and Pesti Út (Pesti Road), it operates as a roundtrip service. This bus service is operated by Budapesti Közlekedési Központ and ArrivaBus.

Route

Stops and connections

References

Bus transport in Hungary